Bang Khu Wat is a tambon (subdistrict) of Mueang Pathum Thani district, Pathum Thani province, central Thailand.

History
In the past, Bang Khu Wat was an area very famous for Thai sugar cane, a delicacy regional sweets. 

There is a rhyming saying of the hawker when selling goods that: 

 

(literally: Chinese sugar cane of Bang Yai, Thai sugar cane of Bang Khu Wat, Khao lam tat of Wat Rakhang, Khanom farang kudi chin, Oh thou).

Geography
Bang Khu Wat has the southeastern part adjacent to the Chao Phraya River, the opposite side is Pak Kret district, Nonthaburi province.

It is bounded by other administrative areas (from north clockwise): Bang Duea and Bang Khayaeng Subdistrict Municipalities in its district, Pak Kret City Municipality, Bang Tanai and Khlong Khoi Subdistrict Administrative Organizations in Pak Kret District of Nonthaburi Province, with Khlong Phra Udom Subdistrict Municipality in Lat Lum Kaeo district.

Administration

Central administration
The entire area is under the administration of Bang Khu Wat Town Municipality (เทศบาลเมืองบางคูวัด).

Local administration
Bang Khu Wat also consists of 12 administrative mubans (villages)

References

External links
 

Tambon of Pathum Thani Province
Populated places on the Chao Phraya River